Joseph F. Stedman (March 11, 1898 – March 23, 1946) was a well-known American priest and author of books about Catholicism.

Biography 
Joseph Stedman was born to Joseph and Ellen Stedman in Brooklyn, New York as one of five children. After attending St. Joseph's Parochial School and St. Francis Preparatory School, he entered St. Francis College in Brooklyn, but left after his junior year and entered Fordham College, where he received his Bachelor of Arts degree, and then entered the St. John's Seminary in Brooklyn. He was ordained on May 21, 1921, and was assigned to Holy Child Jesus Parish in Richmond Hill, Queens. From 1925, Father Stedman was chaplain of the Monastery of the Precious Blood in Brooklyn. He was also Director of the Confraternity of the Precious Blood, which was erected in 1925 at the Monastery Chapel of the Cloistered Sisters Adorers of the Precious Blood. In 1944, Stedman was granted the title of monsignor.

His writings include My Sunday Missal, with illustrations by Ade Bethune, as well as My Military Missal, My Daily Readings from the Four Gospels, the "Triple" Novena Manual, and My Lenten Missal. At the time of his death, it was noted that more than 13,000,000 copies of his books had been sold. He died of a brain tumor at the age of forty-eight, at the Columbia-Presbyterian Medical Center.

References

Roman Catholic writers
American spiritual writers
St. Francis College alumni
Fordham University alumni
1946 deaths
1898 births